Napoleon's Battles is a board game published in 1989 by Avalon Hill.

Contents
Napoleon's Battles is a game in which a set of miniatures rules is presented.

Reception
Mike Siggins reviewed Napoleon's Battles for Games International magazine, and gave it a rating of 5 out of 10, and stated that "quantity cannot replace quality and at the end of the day this is no more than a decidedly average set of miniatures rules with a few smart counters thrown in."

Reviews
Fire & Movement #74

References

Avalon Hill games
Board games introduced in 1989